W27  may refer to:
 W27 warhead, a 1950s nuclear bomb
 Hansa-Brandenburg W.27, prototype fighter floatplane developed in Germany during World War I
 Watkins 27, an American sailboat design